The 2003 Zenit St.Petersburg season was the club's ninth season in the Russian Premier League, the highest tier of association football in Russia.

Squad

Transfers

In

Out

Released

Competitions

Overall record

Premier League

Results by round

Results

Table

Russian Cup

2002–03

Round 16 2nd leg took place during the 2004 season.

Squad statistics

Appearances and goals

|-
|colspan="14"|Players who left Zenit during the season:

|}

Goal scorers

Goal scorers

Disciplinary record

References

FC Zenit Saint Petersburg seasons
Zenit St.Petersburg